is a Japanese crime fiction and horror writer.

There has been an iyamisu (eww mystery) boom in Japan since around 2012. Iyamisu (eww mystery) is a subgenre of mystery fiction which deals with grisly episodes and the dark side of human nature. Readers blurt out "eww" when they are reading iyamisu (eww mystery) novels. Mahokaru Numata, Kanae Minato and Yukiko Mari are regarded as representatives of the genre in Japan.

Works in English translation
Nan-Core (original title: Yurigokoro), trans. Jonathan Lloyd-Davies (Vertical. 2015. )

Awards and nominations
 2004 – Horror and Suspense Grand Prize: Kugatsu ga Eien ni Tsuzukeba (If September Could Last Forever )
 2012 – Haruhiko Oyabu Award: Nan-Core
 2012 – Nominee for Mystery Writers of Japan Award for Best Novel: Nan-Core

Bibliography

Novels
 , 2005
 , 2006
 , 2007
 , 2009
 , 2011 (Nan-Core. Vertical.)

Short story collection
 , 2010

References

External links
 Profile at J'Lit Books from Japan

1948 births
People from Osaka Prefecture
20th-century Japanese novelists
21st-century Japanese novelists
Japanese women short story writers
Japanese mystery writers
Japanese crime fiction writers
Japanese horror writers
Living people
Women mystery writers
Women horror writers
Japanese women novelists
21st-century Japanese women writers
20th-century Japanese women writers
20th-century Japanese short story writers
21st-century Japanese short story writers